Geomyersia is a small genus of skinks, lizards in the family Scincidae. The genus is endemic to the Bismarck Archipelago and the Solomon Islands.

Species and geographic ranges
There are two species which are recognized as being valid:
Geomyersia coggeri  – Cogger's island skink – Bismarck Archipelago
Geomyersia glabra  – Greer's island skink, Solomon minute skink – Solomon Islands

Etymology
The generic name, Geomyersia, is in honor of American herpetologist George S. Myers.

References

Further reading
Greer, Allen E.; Parker, Fred (1968). "Geomyersia glabra, a new genus and species of scincid lizard from Bougainville, Solomon Islands, with comments on the relationship of some lygosomine genera". Breviora (302): 1–17.

 
Reptiles of Oceania
Lizard genera
Taxa named by Allen Eddy Greer
Taxa named by Frederick Stanley Parker